P. lepida may refer to:
 Parasa lepida, the nettle caterpillar or blue-striped nettle grub, a moth species found in  India, Sri Lanka, Vietnam, Malaysia and Indonesia
 Pyrrhura lepida, the pearly parakeet or pearly conure, a parrot species endemic to east Amazonian forests in Brazil

See also
 Lepida (disambiguation)